Armenia competed at the inaugural 7 sports 2018 European Championships from 2 to 12 August 2018. It competed in 4 sports.

Medallists

Aquatics

Diving

Men

Swimming

Men

Women

Athletics

 Men 
 Track and road

Field events

Cycling

Track

Omnium

Points race

Scratch

Gymnastics

Men

Team

Individual finals

External links
 European Championships official site 

2018
Nations at the 2018 European Championships
2018 in Armenian sport